The 2016–17 DePaul Blue Demons men's basketball team represented DePaul University during the 2016–17 NCAA Division I men's basketball season. They played almost all of their home games at Allstate Arena in the Chicago suburb of Rosemont, Illinois, though they scheduled two regular-season games at the considerably smaller McGrath–Phillips Arena, the regular home of the DePaul women's team, on the school's Chicago campus. The Blue Demons, members of the Big East Conference, were led by head coach Dave Leitao, in the second year of his current tenure and fifth overall at DePaul. They finished the season 9–23, 2–16 in Big East play to finish in last place. They lost in the first round of the Big East tournament to Xavier.

The season marked the Blue Demons' final season at Allstate Arena. DePaul moved both its men's and women's teams into the new Wintrust Arena on Chicago's Near South Side. The Blue Demons opened the arena with a game against Notre Dame on November 11, 2017.

Previous season 
The Blue Demons finished the 2015–16 season 9–22, 3–15 in Big East play to finish in ninth place. They lost to Georgetown in the first round of the Big East tournament.

Offseason

Departures

Incoming transfers

2016 recruiting class

2017 recruiting class

2018 recruiting class

Preseason 
Prior to the season, DePaul was picked to finish last in a poll of Big East coaches.

Roster

Schedule and results

|-
!colspan=9 style=| Exhibition

|-
!colspan=9 style=| Non-conference regular season

|-
!colspan=9 style=| Big East Conference regular season

|-
!colspan=9 style=| Big East tournament

References

DePaul Blue Demons men's basketball seasons
DePaul